ProShares is an issuer of exchange-traded funds, including inverse exchange-traded funds, and similar products.

History
ProFunds Group was founded in 1997  with $100,000 by former Rydex employees Louis Mayberg and Michael Sapir. That year, it introduced bear market inverse mutual funds.

In 2006, ProFunds Group launched ProShares and its first inverse exchange-traded fund.

In October 2021, the company launched an exchange-traded fund that invests in Bitcoin futures contracts.

References

External links
 
2006 establishments in Maryland
Companies based in Bethesda, Maryland
Financial services companies of the United States
Financial services companies established in 2006
Investment management companies of the United States